Horace Andrew Dargie (7 July 191730 August 1999) was an Australian musician and harmonicist, television compere and manager and music label founder and arranger.

Life and career

Early life 
Horrie Dargie was born in Whyalla, South Australia, the second son of Andrew Dargie and Adelaide Mary Dargie (née Sargent). His older brother Sir William Dargie was a noted Australian portrait artist.

Music
Dargie began his musical career as a diatonica harmonica player. A self-taught musician, he was inspired greatly by Larry Adler and learned to play the Gershwin composition "Rhapsody in Blue". He joined the Yarraville Mouth Organ Band, which practised in a shoe repair shop. Later he joined William Ketterer's Victorian Mouth Organ Band. The band consisted of some of the most promising players in the state of Victoria.

In the early 1930s he took up the chromatic harmonica and won a variety competition on a local radio station in 1937. In 1938 he moved to Sydney.

Dargie studied clarinet and orchestration and started his own harmonica school in Sydney. With Williamson, Lois, and Metcalfe on chromatics, and Shea on chords and Bertram on bass he started a harmonica group, the Rockin' Reeds.

Army years
Dargie joined the Australian Army in 1941 and served in New Guinea and later in the occupational forces in Japan. He returned to Melbourne in 1947 and subsequently formed the famous Horrie Dargie Quintet. By 1952 the Quintet had risen in popularity by dint of hard work, and played their farewell concert at the Sydney Town Hall in 1952 before leaving for England. By chance, a recording was made of the performance on a wire recorder using just one microphone. The 10″ record of the farewell concert became Australia's first Gold Record, selling 75,000 copies. Upon arrival in England the Quintet performed at the Empire in London and an agent recognised the group's performance as unique because of their distinctive sound, humour, and individual style. They never copied or made renditions of numbers by overseas performers. Whilst on tour in London Horrie contracted polio – apparently he collapsed on stage. The disease affected his diaphragm and legs, at the time he was told he would not be able to play a wind instrument again. He once described the illness as a 'bit of a problem' – he was paralysed except for his right arm and he could swallow. With persistence he recovered and the Quintet later performed upon their return at the Tivoli in 1958. One of their more well known numbers was "Green Door" which become a hit in its own right.

Television presenting
In 1958, Dargie returned to Australia where he took up a position at Channel 9, where he was in charge of the talent division – variety was very popular at the time and Dargie did four or five shows a week. He compered the BP Super Show and also was responsible for the Delo and Daly Show. He was the first Australian compere of the show The Price Is Right and managed The Go!! Show, a pop music show that regularly featured entertainers such as Johnny Young, Ian Turpie and Olivia Newton-John. Dargie also established Go!! Records in 1964 to promote artists who appeared on the show. In August 1967, Channel 0 Melbourne abruptly cancelled The Go!! Show and the loss of its major promotional outlet led to the demise of the Go!! record label.

Musical arrangement
Dargie is also remembered for his musical arrangements for the film Crocodile Dundee and the TV show The Leyland Brothers. Under the musical directorship of Sven Libaek, he also participated in the background music in the 1960s TV show Nature Walkabout (hosted by Vincent Serventy). Dargie also played the background music for the TV series Skippy the Bush Kangaroo.

Honours

ARIA Music Awards
The ARIA Music Awards is an annual awards ceremony that recognises excellence, innovation and achievement across all genres of Australian music. They commenced in 1987. Dargie was inducted into its hall of fame in 1996 in recognition of his effort in being the first Australian to achieve gold record status.

|-
| ARIA Music Awards of 1996
| Horrie Dargie
| ARIA Hall of Fame
|

Death 
Horrie Dargie died on 30 August 1999.

Discography
 "I Hear A Rhapsody" Regal Zonophone (G24419) (November 1941)
 "The Sunshine State" Columbia (DO4018) (February 1959) #81 AUS
 "The Alexandra Waltz" Columbia (DO4085) (August 1959) #33 AUS
 "Tie Me Kangaroo Down, Sport" Astor (A7007) (May 1960) #34 AUS
 "Got A Zac in the Back of Me Pocket" Astor (A7011) (October 1960) #75 AUS
 "My Boomerang Did Come Back" Astor (A7015) (March 1962) #98 AUS

External links
 The Man from Down Yonder – Horrie Dargie (1917–1999)

References

1917 births
1999 deaths
Australian harmonica players
ARIA Award winners
ARIA Hall of Fame inductees
20th-century Australian musicians
Australian Army personnel of World War II